General elections were held in Japan on 18 December 1983 to elect the 511 members of the House of Representatives. The voter turnout was 67.94%, the lowest it had ever been in post-war history up to that point, and a low which would not be surpassed until ten years later.

Contrary to pre-election polls by national daily papers which projected a comfortable majority for the LDP, the latter party lost 34 seats compared to the previous election, falling six seats short of the 256 needed for majority control. As a result, the major conservative party was forced to form a majority coalition government for the first time since 1948. In order to do so, the LDP formed a coalition with the New Liberal Club, a move which JSP leader Masashi Ishibashi called a "betrayal of the electorate."

It is likely that the LDP's losses resulted in great part due to running too many candidates and thus falling prey to the spoiler effect. The biggest winner among the opposition was Kōmeitō, which saw an increase in terms of both seats as well as the popular vote that exceeded all of the other parties. This election also saw considerable tactical voting cooperation between the Japan Socialist Party, Komeito, Socialist Democratic Federation, and Democratic Socialist Party in various combinations, which resulted in varying levels of success for the opposition, but primarily for Komeito's outcome.

Results

By prefecture

References

General elections in Japan
Japan
General election
Japanese general election
Election and referendum articles with incomplete results